The Unbearable Lightness of Being is a 1984 novel by Milan Kundera, about two women, two men, a dog, and their lives in the 1968 Prague Spring period of Czechoslovak history. Although written in 1982, the novel was not published until two years later, in a French translation (as L'insoutenable légèreté de l'être). The original Czech text was published the following year. It was also translated to English from Czech by Michael Henry Heim and published in The New Yorker's March 19, 1984 issue under the "Fiction" section.

Premise
The Unbearable Lightness of Being takes place mainly in Prague in the late 1960s and early 1970s. It explores the artistic and intellectual life of Czech society from the Prague Spring of 1968 to the invasion of Czechoslovakia by the Soviet Union and three other Warsaw Pact countries and its aftermath through the lives of two separate pairs of people and those around them.

Characters
Tomáš: A Czech surgeon and intellectual. Tomáš is a womanizer who lives for his work. He considers sex and love to be distinct entities: he has sex with many women but loves only his wife, Tereza. He sees no contradiction between these two positions. He explains womanizing as an imperative to explore female idiosyncrasies only expressed during sex. At first he views his wife as a burden whom he is obliged to take care of. After the Warsaw Pact invasion, they escape to Zürich, where he starts womanizing again. Tereza, homesick, returns to Prague with the dog. He quickly realizes he wants to be with her and follows her home. He has to deal with the consequences of a letter to the editor in which he metaphorically likened the Czech Communists to Oedipus. Eventually fed up with life in Prague under the Communist regime, Tomáš and Tereza move to the countryside. He abandons his twin obsessions of work and womanizing and discovers true happiness with Tereza. His epitaph, written by his Catholic son, is "He Wanted the Kingdom of God on Earth".
Tereza: Tomáš's young wife. A gentle, intellectual photographer, she delves into dangerous and dissident photojournalism during the Soviet occupation of Prague. Tereza does not condemn Tomáš for his infidelities, instead characterizing herself as a weaker person. Tereza is mostly defined by her view of the body as disgusting and shameful, due to her mother's embrace of the body's grotesque functions. Throughout the book she fears simply being another body in Tomáš's array of women. Once Tomáš and Tereza move to the countryside, she devotes herself to raising cattle and reading. During this time she learns about her anima through an adoration of pet animals, reaching the conclusion that they were the last link to the paradise abandoned by Adam and Eve and becomes alienated from other people.
Sabina: Tomáš's mistress and closest friend. Sabina lives her life as an extreme example of lightness, taking profound satisfaction in the act of betrayal. She declares war on kitsch and struggles against the constraints imposed upon her by her puritan ancestry and the Communist Party. This struggle is shown through her paintings. She occasionally expresses excitement at humiliation, as shown through the use of her grandfather's bowler hat, a symbol that is born during one sexual encounter with Tomáš, before it eventually changes meaning and becomes a relic of the past. Later in the novel, she begins to correspond with Šimon while living under the roof of some older Americans who admire her artistic skill.
Franz: Sabina's lover and a Geneva professor and idealist. Franz falls in love with Sabina, whom he considers a liberal and romantically tragic Czech dissident. He is a kind and compassionate man. As one of the novel's dreamers, Franz bases his actions on loyalty to the memories of his mother and Sabina. His life revolves completely around books and academia, eventually to the extent that he seeks lightness and ecstasy by participating in marches and protests, the last of which is a march in Thailand to the border with Cambodia. In Bangkok after the march, he is mortally wounded during a mugging.
Karenin: The dog of Tomáš and Tereza. Although she is a female dog, the name is masculine and is a reference to Alexei Karenin, the husband in Anna Karenina. Karenin displays extreme dislike of change. Once moved to the countryside, Karenin becomes more content as she is able to enjoy more attention from her companions. She also quickly befriends a pig named Mefisto. During this time Tomáš discovers that Karenin has cancer and even after removing a tumor it is clear that Karenin is going to die. On her deathbed she unites Tereza and Tomáš through her "smile" at their attempts to improve her health.
Šimon: Tomáš's estranged son from an earlier marriage.

Philosophical underpinnings
Challenging the concept of eternal recurrence (the idea that the universe and its events have already occurred and will recur ad infinitum), the story's thematic meditations posit the alternative: that each person has only one life to live and that which occurs in life occurs only once and never again – thus the "lightness" of being. Moreover, this lightness also signifies freedom; Tomáš and Sabina display this lightness, whereas Tereza's character is "weighed down". In the Constance Garnett translation of Tolstoy's War and Peace she gives us the phrase "strange lightness of being" during the description of Prince Andrey's death. In contrast, the concept of eternal recurrence imposes a "heaviness" on life and the decisions that are made – to borrow from Nietzsche's metaphor, it gives them "weight". Nietzsche believed this heaviness could be either a tremendous burden or great benefit depending on the individual's perspective.

The "unbearable lightness" in the title also refers to the lightness of love and sex, which are themes of the novel. Kundera portrays love as fleeting, haphazard and possibly based upon endless strings of coincidences, despite holding much significance for humans.

Quoting Kundera from the book:

The heavier the burden, the closer our lives come to the earth, the more real and truthful they become. Conversely, the absolute absence of burden causes man to be lighter than air, to soar into heights, take leave of the earth and his earthly being, and become only half real, his movements as free as they are insignificant. What then shall we choose? Weight or lightness? ... When we want to give expression to a dramatic situation in our lives, we tend to use metaphors of heaviness. We say that something has become a great burden to us. We either bear the burden or fail and go down with it, we struggle with it, win or lose. And Sabina – what had come over her? Nothing. She had left a man because she felt like leaving him. Had he persecuted her? Had he tried to take revenge on her? No. Her drama was a drama not of heaviness but of lightness. What fell to her lot was not the burden, but the unbearable lightness of being.

In the novel, Nietzsche's concept is attached to an interpretation of the German adage  'one occurrence is not significant'; namely, an "all-or-nothing" cognitive distortion that Tomáš must overcome in his hero's journey. He initially believes "If we only have one life to live, we might as well not have lived at all," and specifically (with respect to committing to Tereza) "There is no means of testing which decision is better, because there is no basis for comparison." The novel resolves this question decisively that such a commitment is in fact possible and desirable.

Publication
The Unbearable Lightness of Being (1984) was not published in the original Czech until 1985 by the exile publishing house 68 Publishers (Toronto, Ontario). The second Czech edition was published in October 2006, in Brno, Czech Republic, some 18 years after the Velvet Revolution, because Kundera did not approve it earlier. The first English translation by Michael Henry Heim was published in hardback in 1984 by Harper & Row in the U.S. and Faber and Faber in the UK and in paperback in 1985.

Film

In 1988, an American-made film adaptation of the novel was released starring Daniel Day-Lewis, Lena Olin and Juliette Binoche and directed by Philip Kaufman. In a note to the Czech edition of the book, Kundera remarks that the movie had very little to do with the spirit either of the novel or the characters in it. In the same note, Kundera goes on to say that after this experience he no longer allows any adaptations of his work.

See also

Existentialism

References

External links

SparkNotes
An essay written by Giuseppe Raudino

1984 French novels
1984 Czech novels
Adultery in novels
Books about Soviet military occupations
Harper & Row books
French novels adapted into films
Czech novels adapted into films
Novels by Milan Kundera
Novels set in Prague
Philosophical novels
Existentialist novels
Postmodern novels
Prague Spring
Faber and Faber books
Éditions Gallimard books